Susan Eisenbach is a Emeritus Professor of Computer Science at Imperial College London. Her research investigates techniques for producing good software systems that behave appropriately.

Education 
Eisenbach completed an undergraduate degree in Mathematics at Vassar College. She completed a masters degree in Mathematical Logic and in Computer Science at the University of London, before working as a school maths teacher.

Career and research
Eisenbach joined the Department of Computing, Imperial College London in September 1983. In 1994 she was appointed Director of Studies, a role she held for 15 years, with overall responsibility for teaching. She took a college wide role as Dean of Teaching and Learning in 2010. In January 2011 she was made Head of the Department of Computing, which she completed September 2016. Currently she is the elected member on College Council. She has supervised numerous PhD students including Diomidis Spinellis and others.

She has published several books on programming. In 1981 she published PASCAL for Programmers. She published Program Design With Modula-2 in 1989. She published Reasoned Programming in 1994. Eisenbach's research focuses on how to produce concurrent programs that behave properly.

She has championed entrepreneurship amongst the student community.  She is an advisor to the computer education program The Turing Lab, a partnership between Imperial College London graduates and YOOX Net-a-Porter Group. Eisenbach has spoken about the lack of women in technology since 2000. She pointed out that when "computing was less popular, we had far more women students". She was part of a discussion host by The Guardian on how to get more women into technology roles in 2013.

References 

American computer scientists
American women computer scientists
Vassar College alumni
Alumni of the University of London
Computer science educators
Living people
Year of birth missing (living people)
21st-century American women